Chris Reynolds may refer to:
Chris Reynolds (author), Welsh comics author
Chris Reynolds, member of Eulogies (band)
Chris Reynolds, member of Red Flag (band)
Chris Reynolds, member of This Is Hell (band)
Chris Reynolds (Home and Away)
Chris Reynolds, member of Stray Kids (band)

See also
Christopher Reynolds (disambiguation)